Ikarus Drachen Tomas Pellicci (English: Thomas Pellicci) is a German aircraft manufacturer based in Stephanskirchen, founded by Tomas Pellicci. The company specializes in the design and construction of beginner hang gliders for schools and flight training use.

History
Tomas Pellicci was born on 23 May 1950, in Stephanskirchen, but emigrated to Australia in his early twenties, where he became involved in flying hang gliders, towed by boats. In 1973, he returned to Germany, where he met an American soldier, Californian Mike Harker, who was flying from hills. His background in model-making earned him a job at a local flight school repairing and modifying Ikarus hang gliders and eventually took over the company. By 2019 he was selling six to eight gliders per year.

Aircraft

References

External links

Aircraft manufacturers of Germany
Hang gliders